The chimpanzees' tea party was a form of public entertainment in which chimpanzees were dressed in human clothes and provided with a table of food and drink.

The first such tea party was held at the London Zoo in 1926, two years after the opening of Monkey Hill. They were put on almost daily during the summer until they were discontinued in 1972. They were the inspiration for the PG Tips television advertisements which began in 1956.

Notes

Chimpanzees
London Zoo
Animals in entertainment
1926 establishments in England
1972 disestablishments in England